Manning River (Biripi: Boolumbahtee), an open and trained mature wave dominated barrier estuary, is located in the Northern Tablelands and Mid North Coast districts of New South Wales, Australia. It is the only double delta river in the southern hemisphere in which there are two permanent entrances to the river, one at Old Bar and another at Harrington, and is famously one of only two rivers in the world to have permanent multiple entrances with the other being the Nile river in Egypt.

Course and features

Manning River rises below Mount Barrington, on the northeastern slopes of the Great Dividing Range within Barrington Tops National Park, east southeast of Ellerston, and flows generally southeast, joined by eleven tributaries including the Pigna Barney, Barnard, Nowendoc, Gloucester, Dawson, and Lansdowne rivers, descending  over its  course from the high upper reaches, through the Manning Valley, and out to sea.

The river flows past the towns of Wingham and Taree. At Taree, the river splits and becomes a double delta. The southern arm reaches its mouth at the Tasman Sea of the South Pacific Ocean, near Old Bar. The northern arm is joined by the Dawson River and further downstream the Lansdowne River, reaching its mouth at the Tasman Sea, near Harrington Point; creating two separate entrances to the river: Harrington Inlet (north) and Farquhar Inlet (south). Within the delta there are several channels dividing coastal land into large islands, such as Mitchells and Oxley islands. Between Croki (in the north) and east of Bohnock (in the south), Scotts Creek links both the northern and southern passages of the river.

The Manning River is one of Australia's few large river systems that have not been dammed for water supply purposes anywhere along its catchment. The local water supply is fed by Bootawa Dam, which is an offsite dam, however, water is pumped from the river to the dam whenever river turbidity and flow levels can allow. A small weir is located in the upper reaches of the Barnard River, part of the inter-basin water transfer of the Barnard River Scheme, enabling water to be pumped into the Hunter River to meet the cooling needs of Bayswater and Liddell electric power stations. The scheme is shut down until needed but as of 2006 this scheme was partly decommissioned due to its rare use.

The Manning River is one of only a few Australian mainland rivers to receive annual winter melting snow deposits.

The Manning River is variously traversed by the Pacific Highway between Taree and Coopernook, and the North Coast railway line at Taree.

History 
The traditional custodians of the land surrounding the Manning River and its associated valley are the Australian Aboriginal Biripi, who named the river as Boolumbahtee, meaning a place where the brolgas played.

In 1818, John Oxley crossed and named Harrington and Farquhar inlets during a trip from the Hastings River, near Port Macquarie, to Port Stephens.  The Manning River itself was first surveyed by Henry Dangar in 1825 and again in 1826 on behalf of the Australian Agricultural Company. Later in 1826, the river was named the Manning River by Robert Dawson for the Deputy Governor of the Australian Agricultural Company, William Manning. In the same year it was declared that the Manning was the northern limit of the Nineteen Counties, defining the areas of New South Wales where settlers were free to occupy.

Until 1913, ships servicing the coast brought goods and supplies up the river. Wingham was established at the furthest point supply boats could reach up the river and became the region's major port. The old cargo wharf at Wingham Brush has since been refurbished. The town of Tinonee was also settled on the river near Taree.

In March 2021, a record breaking low pressure trough brought intense rainfall to the Manning Valley catchment area, inundating properties at Taree and Wingham.

Ecology
The Manning River is a large producer of Australian oysters and is home to many fish, the most common being the Dusky Flathead (Platycephalus fuscus), a common Australian estuary fish. It is also a habitat for the endangered Manning River helmeted turtle, which is endemic to the upper and middle catchments. The Manning River is frequented by dolphins and sharks, with some venturing as far up the river to Wingham.

Whales also frequent the river, mainly at the larger Harrington Inlet, although some do enter the Farquar Inlet and generally do not venture far up river. After becoming a tourist attraction, and repeatedly evading attempts by conservationists to free him "Free Willy" was finally rescued by Seaworld Staff in conjunction with NSW National Parks And Wildlife and ORCA (Organisation for the Rescue and Research of Cetaceans in Australia). "Willy" became stranded on a sandbar, and with the assistance of a specially designed inflatable Cetacean Rescue Device, floated and towed back out to sea and was last seen heading for deeper water to the east.

Events and industry
Taree is home to the annual Manning River Summer Festival, which features rowing, and sailing.  The Taree Powerboat Club Spectacular is held in the Manning River during the Easter long weekend.

The Manning Point Fishing Classic, held annually at Manning Point is the Australian leg of the Poissons et boisson extrêmes extreme fishing tour. The tour pits an invitation only collection of notorious fishers, known for their extreme dedication to the twin arts of fishing and drinking.

Commercial fishing and oyster farming are both practiced in the Manning.  The peak season for oyster production is September to March; and the annual production during 2013 was  dozen. The link between Taree and the oyster industry is shown by the presence in Taree of the "Big Oyster", a building constructed in the shape of an open oyster shell.

The Manning River area is popular for domestic tourism.

See also 

 Rivers of New South Wales
 List of rivers in New South Wales (L-Z)
 List of rivers of Australia

References

External links

 
 

Rivers of New South Wales
Mid-Coast Council
Mid North Coast
Rivers of the Hunter Region
Taree
Northern Tablelands